Sphaenothecus toledoi is a species of beetle in the family Cerambycidae. It was described by Chemsak & Noguera in 1998.

References

Trachyderini
Beetles described in 1998